Occupy Unmasked is a 2012 American documentary film directed by Steve Bannon and produced by David Bossie, which is critical of the Occupy movement and was produced by Citizens United Productions.

The documentary was released in limited theaters on September 21, 2012, distributed by Mark Cuban's Magnolia Pictures. Cuban stated "I don't have any politics" and that his company released the documentary solely "because we believe there is an audience for it" before the 2012 U.S. Presidential election.

Synopsis
The film takes a critical look at the Occupy movement. Andrew Breitbart and producer Stephen Bannon contend that the Occupy movement is sinister, violent, and organized with the purpose of destroying American capitalism and tarnishing the image of New York entrepreneurs. The film also discusses allegations of rape, drug use, and property destruction at the Occupy encampments.

Premiere
The Occupy Unmasked premiere was introduced by Minnesota Congresswoman Michele Bachmann in a tent theater outside of Tampa Bay Times Forum during the 2012 Republican National Convention. 250 people identified as Occupy Wall Street demonstrators attempted to buy tickets but were turned away by the event organizers.

Reception
Writing in The Nation, Michael Tracey allows that it would be possible to sensibly criticize some aspects of the Occupy Movement, but nonetheless characterizes Occupy Unmasked as "total fantasy" and "a deranged hodge-podge of bizarre memes, wild dot-connecting and unadulterated fury." Reviews from right-leaning outlets were more positive, with Perry Chiaramonte of Fox News declaring that the "explosive" documentary raises many important questions about the roots and motivations of the Occupy movement, but fails to conclusively link the protests to the Obama administration.

References

External links

 
 

2012 films
American documentary films
Occupy movement in the United States
Citizens United Productions films
2012 documentary films
Films directed by Steve Bannon
2010s English-language films
2010s American films